James R. Gaines (born August 11, 1947) is a journalist and historian, the author of several books and the former managing editor of Time, Life, and People magazines. Between 2011 and 2015 he was at Reuters in various capacities: as global editor-at-large, as editor in charge of the Americas, as editor in charge of global photography and as global editor for ethics and standards. He spent most of his career at Time Inc., where he began as a writer at People magazine and left twenty years later as corporate editor of Time Inc.  Between Time Inc. and Reuters, he was a consultant on magazine startups, acquisitions and digital initiatives for publishers including Conde Nast International and American Express Publishing.  In 2007 he became the editor-in-chief of FLYP, a biweekly multimedia publication online that produced interactive material for the web sites of Fortune, Sports Illustrated, Entertainment Weekly, Scientific American and ProPublica. He also served as managing editor of The Daily, News Corp’s “newspaper” for tablets.

He is the author of For Liberty and Glory: Washington, Lafayette and Their Revolutions (W. W. Norton, 2007); Evening in the Palace of Reason: Bach Meets Frederick the Great in the Age of Enlightenment (HarperCollins, 2005); and Wit’s End: Days and Nights of the Algonquin Round Table (Harcourt Brace Jovanovich, 1977).

Gaines began his career at Saturday Review, before moving on to Newsweek, where he was a National Affairs writer.

A graduate of the University of Michigan, Gaines is a member of the Council on Foreign Relations, the American Historical Association, the American Society for Eighteenth-Century Studies, the Overseas Press Club, and the Online News Association.

Bibliography
Wit’s End: Days and Nights of the Algonquin Round Table (1977)
The Lives of the Piano (1981) editor
Evening in the Palace of Reason: Bach Meets Frederick the Great in the Age of Enlightenment (2005)
For Liberty and Glory: Washington, Lafayette and Their Revolutions (2007)

Footnotes 

1947 births
Living people
21st-century American historians
American male non-fiction writers
American male journalists
American magazine editors
Place of birth missing (living people)
University of Michigan alumni
21st-century American male writers